S-101 was a Stalinets-class submarine of the Soviet Navy. Her keel was laid down in Gorkiy on 20 June 1937. She was launched on 20 April 1938 and commissioned on 15 December 1940 in the Northern Fleet.

Service history
S-101 served in Northern Fleet; the most notable success of this boat was the torpedoing and sinking of German U-boat  in the Kara Sea. S-101 was awarded with Order of the Red Banner because of the success.

References 

1938 ships
Ships built in the Soviet Union
Soviet S-class submarines
World War II submarines of the Soviet Union
Museum ships in Russia